Werner I, Count of Klettgau was a nobleman and an early member of the House of Habsburg. He was an ancestor of King Rudolph I of Germany.

Werner was sometimes called Werner the Pious. His father was Radbot of Klettgau, and his mother was Ida de Lorraine (also known as Ita von Lothringen), who was the daughter of Frederick I, Duke of Upper Lorraine and Beatrice of France.

In 1057, Werner married Reginlinde of Nellenbourg (1027–1090). He had two sons: Otto II, and Albert II (also known as Albrecht II or Adalbert II).

References

 Werner I. (Habsburg)

External links
 https://web.archive.org/web/20070523114314/http://www.genealogie-mittelalter.de/habsburger/werner_1_graf_von_habsburg_+_1096.html
 http://genealogiequebec.info/testphp/info.php?no=114243

11th-century births
1096 deaths
Year of birth unknown
House of Habsburg